The Aion Y is a compact electric crossover SUV produced by Aion, a marque of Guangzhou Automobile Corporation, since 2021. It was revealed as a concept at Auto Guangzhou in November 2020.

Overview

The Aion Y was revealed at Auto Guangzhou in November 2020 as a concept previewing the fourth model under the Aion brand. It was revealed along two other GAC vehicles; the Trumpchi Empow performance sedan, and a concept vehicle called the GAC Moca.

The Aion Y was launched in the second half of 2021. A ride-hailing-intended version called Aion Y Pio with different side-fenders and front bumper will also be produced.

On March 29, 2021, Aion started taking pre-sale orders for the Aion Y as the brand’s fourth EV. The Aion Y is offered in five models with pre-sale prices ranging from RMB 105,900 to RMB 149,900 (~US$16,128 – US$22,829). The Aion Y is equipped with the ADiGO 3.0 automatic driving assistance system, one-button remote parking and 5G in-vehicle entertainment as well as interior features including a LCD instrument panel and large central control screen.

The Aion Y features the ADiGO 3.0 autonomous driving system and automatic parking. The Y is based on the new GAC GEP 2.0 platform.

Battery and powertrain
The Aion Y offers an option of three different battery packs which are all Magazine Batteries developed by GAC inhouse. The Magazine Battery features a special layout that provides better performance of high temperature resistance and explosion resistance and can be built as a ternary lithium battery or a lithium iron phosphate battery.

The Aion Y with a  battery has a  electric motor.

Four driving modes are available, with three steering modes and additional braking energy recovery modes.

Interior

The Aion Y features a minimalist interior with a large multimedia screen and digital instruments. The central screen has a diameter of 14.5 inches and is oriented horizontally. The Aion Y has 5G connectivity, can operate semi-autonomously, and is able to scan the face of its occupants and then adjust certain settings accordingly according to GAC.

The intelligent equipment of Aion Y, ADiGO 2.0 driver assistance system integrates 5 safe driving assistance functions, including front collision warning (FCW), active brake assist system (AEB), lane departure warning (LDW), lane keeping assist (LKA), driver status monitoring (DMS) and 7 automatic driving assistance functions, including adaptive cruise (ACC), intelligent high beam (IHBC), intelligent speed limit adaptive cruise (iACC), traffic sign recognition (TSR), Traffic jam assist (TJA), remote parking and integrated cruise (ICA).

Aion Y Plus
Unveiled in October 2022, the Aion Y Plus is an updated variant of the all-electric Aion Y which is slightly longer, features a different styling (taking design cues from the smaller Aion V Plus). Compared with the Aion Y, the length of the Aion Y Plus is lengthened to 4535mm. The front overhang is increased by 23mm, while the rear overhang is increased by 102mm, and the total length of the car is increased by 125mm. The wheelbase remains to be the same as the Aion Y. The Aion Y Plus is equipped with a permanent magnet synchronous motors with 150 kW and 225 Nm. Two trim levels are available with the Y Plus 70 Executive Edition powered by a 63.98 kWh lithium iron phosphate battery pack developed by GAC inhouse which supports a pure electric cruising range of 510 km. The Y Plus 80 Executive Edition is equipped with a 76.8 kWh ternary lithium battery pack supporting a pure electric cruising range of 610 km.

Hycan Z03

In October 2021, electric vehicle brand Hycan, the GAC and Nio formed joint venture launched the brand's second product, the Z03.

Three trim levels are offered ay launch.

References

GAC Group
Y
Electric vehicles
Compact sport utility vehicles
Cars introduced in 2020